James Leonard Hall (born 21 March 1945) is an English former footballer who played as a forward.

He started his football career at Northampton ON Chenecks as a youth player gaining one cap for England Youth before he made 450 appearances in the Football League, including over 300 for Peterborough United. He scored 122 League goals for Peterborough between 1967–1975, and is their all-time leading League goalscorer.

References

1945 births
Living people
Footballers from Northampton
Association football forwards
Northampton Town F.C. players
Peterborough United F.C. players
Cambridge United F.C. players
English Football League players
English footballers